Witold Mańczak (12 August 1924 – 12 January 2016) was a Polish linguist. He was a member of Polish Academy of Learning and the Polish Academy of Sciences. 
He is best known for his historical linguistics work on identifying, via statistical methods focusing especially on well-studied European languages, overarching tendencies in analogical change. He has also argued that Gothic is closer to German than to Scandinavian, and suggests Goths originally hailed from somewhere around present day Austria, rather than from Scandinavia."

Publications
 Witold Manczak, The Method of Comparing the Vocabulary in Parallel Texts. Journal of Quantitative Linguistics 10(2): 93–103 (2003) 
 Witold Mańczak (1999). Wieża Babel. Wrocław: Zakład Narodowy im. Ossolińskich. .
Witold Manczak: "Lingwistyka a Prehistoria". BULLETIN DE LA SOCIÉTÉ POLONAISE DE LINGUISTIQUE, fasc. LV, 1999  pdf
Folia Linguistica Historica, Acta Societatis Linguisticae Europaeae . Vol. XXI / 1–2 (2000)
WM: Criticism of naturalness: Naturalness or frequency of occurrence? 
WM: Damaris Nübling, Prinzipien der Irregularisierung. Ein kontrastive Analyse von zehn Verben in zehn germanischen Sprachen
WM: O Odcyfrowaniach pism. BULLETIN DE LA SOCIÉTÉ POLONAISE DE LINGUISTIQUE, fasc. LX, 2004, 
PRAOJCZYZNA SŁOWIAN

See also
Jerzy Kuryłowicz

References

External links
http://bazy.opi.org.pl/raporty/opisy/osoby/59000/o59610.htm

Linguists from Poland
2016 deaths
Place of birth missing
1924 births
20th-century linguists
21st-century linguists
Academic staff of the Polish Academy of Sciences
Members of the Polish Academy of Learning